Death in High Heels is a 1947 British crime film directed by Lionel Tomlinson and starring Don Stannard, Elsa Tee and Veronica Rose. It was based on the 1941 novel of the same title by Christianna Brand. It was a very early Hammer Films (here Marylebone-Hammer) production and was released through Exclusive Films, Hammer's original incarnation. Its running time was just over 50 minutes. It was last shown on British television on Channel 4 in 1991.

Plot
The police are called in when a woman is murdered at a luxury Bond Street shop.

Cast
 Don Stannard as Detective Charlesworth
 Elsa Tee as Victoria David
 Veronica Rose as Agnes Gregory
 Denise Anthony as Aileen
 Patricia Laffan as Magda Doon
 Diana Wong as Miss Almond Blossom
 Nora Gordon as Miss Arris
 Bill Hodge as Mr Cecil
 Kenneth Warrington as Frank Bevan
 Leslie Spurling as Sergeant Bedd

References

External links
 

1947 films
British crime films
1947 crime films
British black-and-white films
Hammer Film Productions films
Films set in London
Films based on British novels
1940s English-language films
1940s British films